The Central Buildings are a heritage-listed series of six shops located at 327 Honour Avenue, Graceville, Brisbane, Queensland, Australia. They are located between Verney Road West and Rakeevan Road. They are listed on the Brisbane Heritage Register.

History
The Central Buildings were constructed in 1924  by local visionary Walter Taylor, a contractor who lived in Graceville.

The buildings are a single story structure constructed of Walter Taylor's signature concrete and demonstrate an art deco suburban commercial premises.

The "Bulk Store" is located on the Rakeevan Street side of the complex and is now used as a garage. Walter Taylor designed and built this to house his office.  The front of the building on the side nearest the Graceville railway station contained his desk and the other side had drafting boards and plans. An extensive warehouse was located at the back with a large work bench the full length of the building.

The Indooroopilly Toll Bridge company had their office in the Central Buildings while they gathered investors to construct the Indooroopilly Toll Bridge (later to be renamed the Walter Taylor Bridge).

Heritage listing 
The Central Buildings were listed on the Brisbane Heritage Register, as they:
 demonstrate the historical commercial development in Graceville
 demonstrate the principal characteristics of a larger suburban interwar commercial premises
 demonstrate the Art Deco style in commercial buildings
 have associations with Walter Taylor, a significant local builder

References

Graceville, Queensland
Brisbane Local Heritage Register